The men's tournament was one of two handball tournaments at the 1976 Summer Olympics. It was the third appearance of a men's handball tournament as a medal event at the Olympic Games, after 1936 and 1972 (a demonstration event was held in 1952).

Qualification

Results

Preliminary round

Group A

Group B

Final round

Ninth place game

Seventh place game

Fifth place game

Bronze medal game

Gold medal game

Rankings and statistics

Final ranking

Top goalscorers

Team rosters

References

Men's tournament
Men's events at the 1976 Summer Olympics